The California flood of 1605 was a massive flood that submerged large portions of present-day California (once known as Alta California). The megaflood was a result of sustained major rain storms across the region, enhanced by an unusually powerful atmospheric river. The flooding affected the indigenous peoples of California, in pre-industrial advancement populations.
    
In addition to this event, geologic evidence indicates that other "megafloods" occurred in the California region in the following years A.D.: 212, 440, 603, 1029, c. 1300, 1418, 1750, 1810, and 1861–62. United States Geological Survey sediment research revealed that the 1605 flood deposited a layer of silt two inches thick at the Santa Barbara basin, indicating that it was the worst flood event of the past 2,000 years, being at least 50% more powerful than any of the others recorded based on geological evidence. The United States Geological Survey has developed a hypothetical scenario, known as the "ARkStorm", that would occur should a similar event occur in modern-day California.

In 1861–62, another atmospheric river event resulted in the Great Flood of 1862, which submerged most of Central Valley and parts of Southern California, and caused the state capital to be temporarily moved from the flooded Sacramento to San Francisco, with other adjacent western states also flooded.

See also

Great Flood of 1862
ARkStorm
Atmospheric river
Pineapple Express
Extreme weather
Lists of floods in the United States

References

External links

Mexican California
California
Pre-statehood history of California
1605 in North America
1605 natural disasters
17th century in California
17th-century floods